Melody Thomas Scott (born Melody Ann Thomas, April 18, 1956) is an American actress best known for playing Nikki Newman on the soap opera The Young and the Restless.

Early life and acting career
Scott was born Melody Ann Thomas in Los Angeles. Her first film credit was as a child actress in the 1964 Alfred Hitchcock movie Marnie. After parts in television and movies in the mid-1970s (most notably in John Wayne's final film, The Shootist in 1976, in which she becomes the last actress to exchange lines with Wayne), she was offered parts on nighttime series such as, The Rockford Files, Charlie's Angels, and a recurring role on The Waltons.

In 1979, at the age of 23, she left The Waltons to take over the role of Nikki Reed, a poor girl from the wrong side of the tracks, on the daytime serial The Young and the Restless, choosing the part over a sitcom pilot that in the end was not picked up. She was a replacement for the previous Nikki, who had lasted six months.  Over time, her character reformed and became an important part of Genoa City society, as she married Victor Newman (Eric Braeden). Scott has said, "It's a miracle for an actor to have a job last 35 years. I am so blessed."

She was a celebrity guest on The $25,000 Pyramid for a week in June 1985.

On February 19, 2019 The Young and the Restless featured a stand-alone episode to honor Scott's 40-year history with the serial.

Personal life
On the set of The Young and the Restless, she met her third husband, the show's executive producer Edward J. Scott. They married in 1985 and have three daughters, Jennifer (his daughter from a previous marriage), Alexandra Danielle Yeaggy (father is the late Carlos Yeaggy, a makeup man Melody met on the set of Y&R.) and Elizabeth. The family resides in Beverly Hills, California. Jennifer gave birth to twins on May 25, 2011, a boy named James and a girl named Charlotte. James and Charlotte are Melody and Edward's first and second grandchild, respectively.

Acting roles

Awards and nominations

Daytime Emmys Pre-Nomination, Outstanding Lead Actress (2005, 2008)

See also
Victor Newman and Nikki Reed
Supercouple

References

External links

 
 Melody's official page

1956 births
Living people
20th-century American actresses
21st-century American actresses
Actresses from Los Angeles
American child actresses
American film actresses
American soap opera actresses
American television actresses